Palmer Ridge High School (PR, or PRHS) is a public high school in Monument, Colorado, United States, serving students in grades 9–12. It is one of two high schools in the Lewis-Palmer School District, with admission based primarily on the locations of students' homes.

As of 2022, Palmer Ridge offers 24 varsity sports, 20 Advanced Placement courses, and occupational skills training in partnership with Pikes Peak Community College and the International Salon and Spa Academy.

At the time of its construction in 2008, Palmer Ridge High School was the largest public geothermal project in the state of Colorado.

History

Establishment 
In 2006, Lewis-Palmer School District decided to build a second high school to alleviate crowding in Lewis-Palmer High School.  They intended to take the land of Mary Wissler, a local ranch owner, through the use of eminent domain.  Many people were outraged, and threatened to recall the school board by collecting thousands of signatures. The district eventually chose another plot of land.

Building 
H+L Architecture designed the building for Palmer Ridge High School. Saunders Construction built the actual building, and finished in time for the 2008-2009 school year. The building covered  after its completion.

Opening 
Palmer Ridge High School opened in August 2008, with approximately 530 students and 70 faculty members.

See also 
Lewis-Palmer School District 38

References

External links 

Schools in El Paso County, Colorado
Public high schools in Colorado
Educational institutions established in 2008
2008 establishments in Colorado